In mathematics, compact objects, also referred to as finitely presented objects, or objects of finite presentation, are objects in a category satisfying a certain finiteness condition.

Definition
An object X in a category C which admits all filtered colimits (also known as direct limits) is called compact if the functor

commutes with filtered colimits, i.e., if the natural map

The terminology is motivated by an example arising from topology mentioned below. Several authors also use a terminology which is more closely related to algebraic categories:  use the terminology finitely presented object instead of compact object.  call these the objects of finite presentation.

Compactness in ∞-categories

The same definition also applies if C is an ∞-category, provided that the above set of morphisms gets replaced by the mapping space in C (and the filtered colimits are understood in the ∞-categorical sense, sometimes also referred to as filtered homotopy colimits).

Compactness in triangulated categories

For a triangulated category C which admits all coproducts,  defines an object to be compact if

commutes with coproducts. The relation of this notion and the above is as follows: suppose C arises as the homotopy category of a stable ∞-category admitting all filtered colimits. (This condition is widely satisfied, but not automatic.) Then an object in C is compact in Neeman's sense if and only if it is compact in the ∞-categorical sense. The reason is that in a stable ∞-category,  always commutes with finite colimits since these are limits. Then, one uses a presentation of filtered colimits as a coequalizer (which is a finite colimit) of an infinite coproduct.

Examples

The compact objects in the category of sets are precisely the finite sets.

For a ring R, the compact objects in the category of R-modules are precisely the finitely presented R-modules. In particular, if R is a field, then compact objects are finite-dimensional vector spaces.

Similar results hold for any category of algebraic structures given by operations on a set obeying equational laws.  Such categories, called varieties, can be studied systematically using Lawvere theories. For any Lawvere theory T, there is a category Mod(T) of models of T, and the compact objects in Mod(T) are precisely the finitely presented models.  For example: suppose T is the theory of groups. Then Mod(T) is the category of groups, and the compact objects in Mod(T) are the finitely presented groups.

The compact objects in the derived category  of R-modules are precisely the perfect complexes.

Compact topological spaces are not the compact objects in the category of topological spaces. Instead these are precisely the finite sets endowed with the discrete topology.

Non-examples

Derived category of sheaves of Abelian groups on a noncompact X 
In the unbounded derived category of sheaves of Abelian groups  for a non-compact topological space , it is generally not a compactly generated category.

Derived category of quasi-coherent sheaves on an Artin stack 
For algebraic stacks  over positive characteristic, the unbounded derived category  of quasi-coherent sheaves is in general not compactly generated, even if  is quasi-compact and quasi-separated. In fact, for the algebraic stack , there are no compact objects other than the zero object. This observation can be generalized to the following theorem: if the stack  has a stabilizer group  such that

  is defined over a field  of positive characteristic
  has a subgroup isomorphic to 

In particular, the category is not compactly generated.

Compactly generated categories

In most categories, the condition of being compact is quite strong, so that most objects are not compact. For example, any vector space V is the filtered colimit of its finite-dimensional (i.e., compact) subspaces. Hence the category of vector spaces (over a fixed field) is compactly generated.

Categories which are compactly generated and also admit all colimits are called accessible categories.

Relation to dualizable objects

For categories C with a well-behaved tensor product (more formally, C is required to be a monoidal category), there is another condition imposing some kind of finiteness, namely the condition that an object is dualizable. If the monoidal unit in C is compact, then any dualizable object is compact as well. For example, R is compact as an R-module, so this observation can be applied. Indeed, in the category of R-modules the dualizable objects are the finitely presented projective modules, which are in particular compact. In the context of ∞-categories, dualizable and compact objects tend to be more closely linked, for example in the ∞-category of complexes of R-modules, compact and dualizable objects agree.

References

 
 

 

 

Category theory